Alalngar (also written as: Alalĝar, Alalgar, or Alaljar)(Sumerian:) was the second ensí of Eridu, according to the Sumerian King List. He was also the second king of Sumer. Also according to the Sumerian King List: Alalngar was preceded by Alulim. Additionally, Alalngar was succeeded by En-men-lu-ana of Bad-tibira. Alalngar was said to have reigned for thirty-six-thousand years.

See also

Sumer
Mesopotamia
Ancient Near East
Sumerian King List

References

|-

Antediluvian Sumerian kings
Sumerian kings